A number of ships have been named Avalon, after Avalon, the mythical Arthurian island or Avalon, California

Merchant ships
, a Great Eastern Railway passenger ferry steamer, sold as a blockade runner 
, a Great Eastern Railway passenger-cargo ferry steamer, replaced the above
, a cargo ship, built by Swan Hunter, Wallsend for C T Bowring 
, a sidewheel passenger ship, built by Harlan and Hollingsworth
, a passenger vessel, operating Catalina–Los Angeles 1920–1951
, a cargo ship 1974–1981, built as Empire Wallace
, a passenger-roro ferry built by Alexander Stephen & Sons, Glasgow for British Railways
Avalon (1963), a passenger-cargo ship previously known as

Naval ships

United States Navy  
, a motorboat acquired for use as a patrol boat in 1917 and returned to her owner in 1918 perhaps without having been commissioned
, a steamer in commission from 1918 to 1919, renamed USS Avalon for her last three days under U.S. Navy control
DSRV-2 Avalon, a deep submergence rescue vehicle launched in 1971 and decommissioned in 2000

Canadian Navy 
 HMCS Avalon was a shore base at St. John's, Newfoundland during World War II
, an accommodation vessel from 1942 to 1947, previously passenger vessel Georgian ex-Cape Eternity ex-Rochester on the Great Lakes and St Lawrence
, a harbour vessel, later HC 31

Royal Navy  
 , former Norwegian trawler Nordhav I, hired in 1940, and renamed Adonis in 1941. Built as Océan in 1915

See also
 Avalon (disambiguation)

References

External links
 

Ship names